(Ronald) Glyndwr Hackett (b 1947) is a Welsh Anglican priest.

Hackett was educated at Hatfield College, Durham and Ripon College, Cuddesdon. He was ordained in 1973 and served curacies in Pembroke and Bassaleg. Hackett held incumbencies in Blaenavon, Newport and Mamhilad. He was Archdeacon of Monmouth from 2001 to 2008; and Archdeacon of Newport from 2008 to 2012.

References

1947 births
20th-century Welsh Anglican priests
21st-century Welsh Anglican priests
Living people
Archdeacons of Newport
Archdeacons of Monmouth
Alumni of Ripon College Cuddesdon
Alumni of Hatfield College, Durham